Dunedin Central was a parliamentary electorate in the city of Dunedin in Otago, New Zealand from 1881 to 1890 and 1905 to 1984.

Population centres
The previous electoral redistribution was undertaken in 1875 for the 1875–1876 election. In the six years since, New Zealand's European population had increased by 65%. In the 1881 electoral redistribution, the House of Representatives increased the number of European representatives to 91 (up from 84 since the 1875–1876 election). The number of Māori electorates was held at four. The House further decided that electorates should not have more than one representative, which led to 35 new electorates being formed, including Dunedin Central, and two electorates that had previously been abolished to be recreated. This necessitated a major disruption to existing boundaries.

History
Thomas Bracken, who at the  had unsuccessfully contested the  electorate, was the first representative. He served for the rest of the term and then retired.

The  was contested by Edward Cargill and Frederick Fitchett, and won by Fitchett. Fitchett served one term and then retired. The electorate was abolished at the end of the term in 1890.

The Dunedin Central electorate was won by James Arnold in that year, who was also of the Liberal Party. Statham was a representative of the Reform Party, but became an Independent in 1919. Munro, who represented the United Labour Party, and Statham contested the resulting , which was narrowly won by Statham. He continued to represent the electorate until his retirement in 1935.

He served for three terms before he retired in 1946. MacDonell then failed to get selected by Labour for the Dunedin West electorate and then stood as an Independent, but he was unsuccessful.

Members of Parliament
The electorate was represented by nine Members of Parliament:

Key

Election results

1981 election

1978 election

1975 election

1972 election

1969 election

1966 election

1963 election

1960 election

1957 election

1954 election

1951 election

1949 election

1946 election

1943 election

1938 election

1935 election

1931 election

1928 election

1915 by-election

1914 election

1886 by-election

Notes

References

Historical electorates of New Zealand
Politics of Dunedin
1881 establishments in New Zealand
1905 establishments in New Zealand
1890 disestablishments in New Zealand
1984 disestablishments in New Zealand